Wylie Independent School District is a school district based in Wylie, Texas, United States and covers much of south central Collin County.

Wylie ISD serves most of the city of Wylie, including the city of St. Paul, a portion of the city of Murphy, and the Collin County portion of the city of Sachse.  Enrollment has grown to just over 17,000 students. The average student to teacher ratio is 17:1.

In 2009, the school district was rated "recognized" by the Texas Education Agency.

History
In the 1890s, the town of Wylie had been served by a small school with small funding primarily by the parents of the students of the schools. Thomas Franklin Birmingham noticed this problem traveling and established Wylie ISD in 1901-1902. He set limits of the district that all citizens in that area would pay taxes to uphold the district. The Birmingham family had provided money to build a proper High School. Since then the Birmingham family has established various Land Trusts to fund areas of curriculum for the district as well as scholarships for the top 22 of the graduating class. The city and district has honored him and his family with the Birmingham Elementary School and streets among other things.

In 2007 the Wylie East High School opened for the 2007-2008 school year. In 2009, the school was rated "exemplary" by the Texas Education Agency.

In the summer of 2015 all Wylie ISD campuses underwent renovations to bring them well in the 21st century. In 2019, voters approved a new $193.7 million dollar bond issue for improvements and expansion of schools throughout the district.

The most recent school to have been built was George W. Bush Elementary school, which opened the beginning of the 2016-2017 school year.

Standardized dress
Since the 2006-2007 school year, all Wylie ISD students in grades 5 through 12 have had to comply with a standardized dress code, which is similar to a school uniform. In the 2007-2008 school year, the dress code went largely unchanged, except that hooded sweatshirts were not accepted.  The dress code included wearing a tucked in solid polo shirt, turtle neck, or button up shirts. Bottoms were specified to be pants, shorts, or skirt, paired with a belt, in khaki, black, or navy blue.

In 2011, the Wylie ISD school board officially changed its policy to allow hooded sweatshirts, pants with rivets, cargo pants, colored belts, and shoelaces. The dress code was changed again in 2017 to allow all hoodies, untucked shirts, and mock turtle necks.

In May 2021, dress code was changed by the Wylie ISD school board once again to allow a more relaxed dress code for the 2021-22 school year. The dress code allows for solid colored pants, but still prohibits: holes, rips, and or tears.

Schools

Primary schools

Elementary schools (K-4)
 Akin Elementary School
 Birmingham Elementary School
 Cox Elementary School
 Dodd Elementary School
 Groves Elementary School
 George W. Bush Elementary School
 Hartman Elementary School
 Smith Elementary School
 Tibbals Elementary School
 Watkins Elementary School
 Whitt Elementary School

Intermediate schools (5-6)
Davis Intermediate School
Draper Intermediate School
Harrison Intermediate School

Secondary schools

Junior high schools (7-8)
Burnett Junior High School 
Cooper Junior High School 
McMillan Junior High School

High schools (9-12)
 Wylie High School
 Wylie East High School

Alternative schools (1-12)
 Achieve Academy

References

External links

 Enrollment Information

School districts in Collin County, Texas
1901 establishments in Texas
School districts established in 1901